Nikita Vyacheslavovich Sergeyev (born 17 October 1999) is a Russian football player who plays as a left winger for FC Spartak Kostroma.

Club career
He made his debut in the Russian Professional Football League for FC Krasnodar-2 on 3 October 2017 in a game against FC Kuban-2 Krasnodar. He made his Russian Football National League debut for Krasnodar-2 on 17 July 2018 in a game against FC Sibir Novosibirsk.

He made his Russian Premier League debut for FC Krasnodar on 1 March 2020 in a game against FC Ufa. He substituted Wanderson in the 88th minute.

Career statistics

References

External links
 
 
 
 

1999 births
People from Ruzayevka
Sportspeople from Mordovia
Living people
Russian footballers
Russia youth international footballers
Association football forwards
FC Krasnodar players
FC Krasnodar-2 players
FC Spartak Kostroma players
Russian Premier League players
Russian First League players
Russian Second League players